Don McCulloch (born March 23, 1951) is a Canadian former professional ice hockey player. He played in 51 WHA games with the Vancouver Blazers during the 1974–75 season.

References

External links

1951 births
Canadian ice hockey defencemen
Ice hockey people from Ontario
Living people
Niagara Falls Flyers players
People from Manitoulin Island
Philadelphia Flyers draft picks
Richmond Robins players
St. Catharines Black Hawks players
Tulsa Oilers (1964–1984) players
Vancouver Blazers players
Canadian expatriate ice hockey players in the United States